Alfredo Maria Adriano d'Escragnolle Taunay, Viscount of Taunay (February 22, 1843 – January 25, 1899), was a Brazilian writer, musician, professor, military engineer, historian, politician, sociologist and nobleman. He is famous for the regionalist novel , considered a major forerunner of naturalism in Brazil, and for A Retirada da Laguna (1874; originally written in 1872 in French as Le retraite de Laguna), an account of an episode in the Paraguayan War. The Brazilianist Leslie Bethell has described it as "the one undoubted literary masterpiece produced by the Paraguayan War".

He founded and occupied the 13th chair of the Brazilian Academy of Letters from 1897 until his death in 1899.

Life

Taunay was born in Rio de Janeiro, in 1843. His father was Félix Taunay, Baron of Taunay, a painter, professor and headmaster of the Escola Nacional de Belas Artes; his mother, Gabriela Hermínia Robert d'Escragnolle Taunay, was one of the sisters of Gastão d'Escragnolle, the Baron d'Escragnolle; and his grandfather was the French painter Nicolas-Antoine Taunay, Baron of Taunay. Growing up in a cultured environment, Taunay studied Literature and Humanities at the Colégio Pedro II, graduating in 1858. He studied physics and mathematics in what is now the Academia Militar das Agulhas Negras. An Ensign in 1862, bachelor in Mathematics in 1863 and an Artillery Lieutenant in 1864, he was matriculated in the second year of military engineering course, but he did not finish it because of the Paraguayan War. From his experiences at the war, he wrote the memoir Cenas de Viagem in 1868 and the historic account La Retraite de Laguna (French for The Retreat of Laguna) in 1872, translating it to Portuguese two years later.

Taunay wrote and published his first romance, Mocidade de Trajano (Trajan's Youth), in 1871, under the pen name Sílvio Dinarte. Appointed by the future Viscount of Rio Branco José Maria da Silva Paranhos Sr., he became the general deputy of Goiás from 1872 to 1875, a Major in 1875 and the governor of Santa Catarina from 1876 to 1877. In 1885, he asked for his demission of the Major post.

They had one son, the historian Afonso d'Escragnolle Taunay (1876–1958).

Taunay was a member of the Conservative Party, but when the party fell, in 1878, he travelled to Europe, returning only in 1880.

From 1881 to 1884, he was the deputy of Santa Catarina. He candidated himself to the post of deputy of Rio de Janeiro, but was defeated in the elections. From 1885 to 1886, he was the governor of Paraná. One of Taunay's most famous deeds as governor of Paraná was the inauguration of the Passeio Público in the capital Curitiba, in 1886.

In 1889, Emperor Pedro II gave him the title of Viscount of Taunay. However, when Brazil became a Republic, all the nobility ranks were abolished. Taunay, disgusted, abandoned his political career, since he was a monarchist.

He died in 1899 due to diabetes.

Works

Novels
 Mocidade de Trajano (1871 – under pen name Sílvio Dinarte)
 La Retraite de Laguna (published in 1872, originally in French; translated into Portuguese by Taunay in 1874)
 Inocência (1872)
 Lágrimas do Coração (1873)
 Ouro Sobre Azul (1875)
 O Encilhamento (1894)
 No Declínio (1899)

Short story collections
 Histórias Brasileiras (1874)
 Narrativas Militares (1878)
 Ao Entardecer (1901)

Theater
 Da Mão à Boca se Perde a Sopa (1874)
 Por um Triz, Coronel! (1880)
 Amélia Smith (1886)

Other
 Cenas de Viagem (1874)
A Retirada da Laguna (1874)  (published in French as La retraite de Laguna, 1871)
 Estudos Críticos (1881–1883)
 Céus e Terras do Brasil (1882)

Posthumous works
 Reminiscências (1908)
 Trechos de Minha Vida (1911)
 Viagens de Outrora (1921)
 Visões do Sertão (1923)
 Dias de Guerra e do Sertão (1923)
 Homens e Coisas do Império (1924)

References

External links

 
 
 
 
 A biography of Taunay 
 Taunay's biography at the official site of the Brazilian Academy of Letters 

1843 births
1899 deaths
Brazilian male novelists
Brazilian male short story writers
Brazilian nobility
Brazilian monarchists
Brazilian male dramatists and playwrights
Brazilian sociologists
Portuguese-language writers
South American writers in French
Brazilian people of French descent
Brazilian memoirists
Deaths from diabetes
Members of the Brazilian Academy of Letters
Governors of Paraná (state)
Conservative Party (Brazil) politicians
Members of the Senate of the Empire of Brazil
Governors of Santa Catarina (state)
19th-century Brazilian novelists
19th-century Brazilian dramatists and playwrights
19th-century Brazilian short story writers
19th-century Brazilian male writers
19th-century memoirists